Pharmaceutical Press is the publishing arm of the Royal Pharmaceutical Society (formerly the Royal Pharmaceutical Society of Great Britain).  It is a provider of independent pharmaceutical information.  

Its principal publishing focus is the design, manufacture and therapeutic use of medicines, as well as the professional concerns of those working to ensure their safe administration and use. Its international catalogue contains more than 150 print and digital works, with a range of products consisting of reference works, textbooks, professional titles and subscription products.

The most renowned resources include:

 Martindale: The complete drug reference – a drug reference book providing unbiased, evaluated information on all drugs and medicines in clinical use.
 British National Formulary and British National Formulary for Children – the UK standard reference in the use and selection of medicines, published in conjunction with the BMJ Group.
 The Pharmaceutical Journal and PJ Publications – the official weekly journal of the Royal Pharmaceutical Society, providing news coverage on all aspects of pharmacy, and original research and articles on pharmaceutical and related subjects.
 MedicinesComplete – an online service providing access to multiple drug information resources on a single platform.

References

External links 
 Pharmaceutical Press

Publishing companies of the United Kingdom
Pharmacology literature
Pharmaceuticals policy
Pharmacy in the United Kingdom
1841 establishments in the United Kingdom
Publishing companies established in 1841